The Fruitbearing Society (German Die Fruchtbringende Gesellschaft, lat. societas fructifera) was a German literary society founded in 1617 in Weimar by German scholars and nobility. Its aim was to standardize vernacular German and promote it as both a scholarly and literary language, after the pattern of the Accademia della Crusca in Florence and similar groups already thriving in Italy, followed in later years also in France (1635) and Britain.

It was also known as the Palmenorden ("Palm Order") because its emblem was the then-exotic fruitbearing coconut palm.  (1576–1629), Hofmarschall at the court in Weimar, was the founding father of the society. As a young man he had travelled Italy and got inspired by the Italian language academies. During the funeral celebrations of Duchess Dorothea Maria in August 1617 which were attended by several princes he took the opportunity to propose the founding of a society following the example of the Italian Accademia della Crusca. Particularly Prince Ludwig von Anhalt-Köthen who already had joined the Accademia della Crusca in 1600 took hold of the idea and became the first president of the Palm Order.

The society counted a king (Charles X Gustav of Sweden), 153 Germanic princes, and over 60 barons, nobles, and distinguished scholars among its members.  It disbanded in 1668.

The first book about the Palm Order, Der Teutsche Palmbaum, was written by Carl Gustav von Hille and published in Nuremberg in 1647.

Members
The society had 890 members. Of these, the below list only includes those that have articles on the English Wikipedia. For a complete list, including their fruitbearing names, see this German article.

 Matthias Abele von und zu Lilienberg
 Johann Valentin Andreae
 Christian I of Anhalt-Bernburg
 Christian II of Anhalt-Bernburg
 Viktor Amadeus of Anhalt-Bernburg
 Georg Aribert of Anhalt-Dessau
 Johann Georg I of Anhalt-Dessau
 Johann Georg II of Anhalt-Dessau
 Johann Kasimir of Anhalt-Dessau
 Friedrich of Anhalt-Harzgerode
 Emanuel of Anhalt-Köthen
 Leberecht of Anhalt-Köthen
 Ludwig I of Anhalt-Köthen
 Ludwig der Jüngere of Anhalt-Köthen
 Wilhelm Ludwig of Anhalt-Köthen
 August of Anhalt-Plötzkau
 Johann of Anhalt-Zerbst
 Karl Wilhelm of Anhalt-Zerbst
 Rudolf of Anhalt-Zerbst
 Hans Georg von Arnim
 Frederick V, Margrave of Baden-Durlach
 Johan Banér
 Steno Bielke
 Sigmund von Birken
 Wilhelm of Birkenfeld
 Frederick William of Brandenburg
 George William of Brandenburg
 John of Brandenburg
 Christian of Brandenburg-Bayreuth
 George of Brunswick-Lüneburg
 Christian Louis of Brunswick-Lüneburg
 Anthony Ulrich of Brunswick-Lüneburg
 Augustus the Younger of Brunswick-Lüneburg
 Ferdinand Albert I of Brunswick-Lüneburg
 Friedrich Ulrich von Braunschweig und Lüneburg-Wolfenbüttel
 Rudolf von Bünau
 Rudolf von Bünau
 Johann Cothmann
 Christoph von Dohna
 Robert Douglas
 Ernst von Freyberg
 Andreas Gryphius
 Christian Gueintz
 Friedrich Kasimir von Hanau
 Philipp Moritz von Hanau-Münzenberg
 Georg Philipp Harsdörffer
 David Elias Heidenreich
 Wilhelm Christoph von Hesse-Bingenheim und Hesse-Homburg
 Johann von Hessen-Braubach
 Ludwig VI of Hesse-Darmstadt
 Ludwig VII of Hesse-Darmstadt
 Friedrich of Hesse-Eschwege
 Friedrich II of Hesse-Homburg
 Georg Christian of Hesse-Homburg
 Moritz of Hesse-Kassel
 Wilhelm V of Hesse-Kassel
 Wilhelm VI of Hesse-Kassel
 Hermann IV of Hesse-Rotenburg
 Georg Friedrich of Hohenlohe-Neuenstein-Weikersheim
 Hans Christoff von Königsmarck
 Otto Wilhelm von Königsmarck
 Johann Kasimir Kolbe von Wartenberg
 Christoph Christian zu Altleiningen
 Johann Anton von Leiningen
 Philipp II von Leiningen Westerburg
 Friedrich von Logau
 Adolf Friedrich I of Mecklenburg-Schwerin
 Franz von Mercy
 Bernhard Meyer
 Johann Michael Moscherosch
 Johann Ludwig of Nassau-Hadamar
 Georg Neumark
 Adam Olearius
 Martin Opitz
 Axel Oxenstierna
 Christian Franz Paullini
 Ottavio Piccolomini
 Jost Andreas von Randow
 Wilhelm von Rath
 Johann Rist
 John George II of Saxony
 Johann Philipp of Saxe-Altenburg
 Adolf Wilhelm of Saxe-Eisenach
 Albrecht of Saxe-Eisenach
 Johann Georg I of Saxe-Eisenach
 Ernst I of Saxe-Gotha
 Friedrich of Saxe-Gotha
 Bernhard of Saxe-Jena
 Augustus of Saxe-Lauenburg
 Francis Erdmann of Saxe-Lauenburg
 Julius Henry of Saxe-Lauenburg
 Christian of Saxe-Merseburg
 Bernhard of Saxe-Weimar
 Friedrich of Saxe-Weimar
 Johann Ernst the Younger of Saxe-Weimar
 Johann Ernst of Saxe-Weimar
 Wilhelm IV of Saxe-Weimar
 Albrecht of Saxe-Weißenfels
 August of Saxe-Weißenfels
 August the Younger of Saxe-Weißenfels
 Heinrich of Saxe-Weißenfels
 Johann Adolph of Saxe-Weißenfels
 Moritz of Saxe-Zeitz
 Angelo Sala
 Joachim von Sandrart
 Karl Günther of Schwarzburg-Rudolstadt
 Ludwig Günther of Schwarzburg-Rudolstadt
 Anton Günther of Schwarzburg-Sondershausen
 Veit Ludwig von Seckendorf
 Torsten Stålhandske
 Wolrad IV of Waldeck-Eisenberg
 Christian of Waldeck-Wildungen
 Matthäus von Wesenbeck
 Anton von Wietersheim
 Karl Gustav Wrangel
 Julius Siegmund von Württemberg-Oels-Juliusburg
 Sylvius Friedrich von Württemberg-Oels-Juliusburg
 Philipp von Zesen
 Heinrich Ziegler

Notes

References
 University of California, Berkeley, News article: Taking pride in their language, finding uses for everything February 11, 2004
 die-fruchtbringende-gesellschaft.de (List of members)

External links

 Finding aid to the Fruchtbringende Gesellschaft Collection: Manuscript and Pictorial Material, 1592–1754 at The Bancroft Library
 Neue Fruchtbringende Gesellschaft zu Köthen/Anhalt

1617 establishments in the Holy Roman Empire
German writers' organisations
History of Weimar
Culture in Weimar
Education in Weimar
History of Anhalt
1668 disestablishments in Europe